Lindiwe Mazibuko (born 9 April 1980) is a Swazi-born South African academic, former politician, musician and the former leader of the Official Opposition Democratic Alliance (DA). She was elected DA Parliamentary Leader on 27 October 2011, beating incumbent Athol Trollip in a tight race, becoming the first non-white person to lead the Democratic Alliance in Parliament.

Mazibuko resigned from her position as a member of the Official Opposition  in 2014, to study at Harvard University in the United States for a year. She stated that her resignation had nothing to do with differences within the DA, but that it would improve what she could offer the party politically. It does appear, however, that there was a serious and fundamental tension between her and party leader Helen Zille that led to her departure. Zille stated that Mazibuko knew she would lose the election for Parliamentary Leader, calling her move to Harvard "plan B". She became less popular towards the end of her tenure, and was described as arrogant and autocratic by members in the DA's caucus in Parliament.

Early life and education
Lindiwe Mazibuko was born on 9 April 1980 in Swaziland into a mixed-race family. At the age of six she moved to KwaZulu-Natal with her parents. Her father was a banker and her mother a nurse.

Mazibuko grew up in Durban and matriculated at St Mary’s DSG in Kloof in 1997. She pursued a Bachelor of Music at the University of KwaZulu-Natal and then moved on to obtaining a BA (French, Classics, Media & Writing) at the University of Cape Town in 2006 and a BA Honours (Political Communication) in 2007.

Mazibuko’s career in politics started when she decided to write her honours dissertation on Helen Zille at the time when Zille took over leadership of the Democratic Alliance (DA) from Tony Leon. Mazibuko spent time doing research into Zille’s tenure as Mayor of Cape Town and DA Leader, as well as into the DA's policies and programmes of action. She found them to be very much in agreement with her own ideologies and political vision for South Africa.

In May 2015, she graduated from Harvard University with a Master's Degree in Public Administration. During the Fall of 2015 she was a fellow at the Harvard Institute of Politics.

Background
After matriculating at St Mary's DSG Kloof, Lindiwe Mazibuko chose to further her studies at university. A graduate of the University of Cape Town, Mazibuko wrote a paper  on the DA after then party leader Tony Leon stepped down in 2006. Upon graduating Mazibuko took up a post in the DA as the party's media liaison officer in Parliament.

Labelled a "star performer" by party leader Helen Zille, Mazibuko became a parliamentary candidate for the party in the 2009 general elections. She appeared third on the DA's KwaZulu-Natal list, thus qualifying for a seat in Parliament as the DA retained its status as the Official Opposition. She was subsequently appointed as the DA's Shadow Deputy Minister of Communications, and also succeeded Donald Lee as the party's National Spokesperson.

In December 2013 Mazibuko appeared on a special edition of the BBC’s Question Time, broadcast from Johannesburg. Other panelists on the show included Peter Hain, Andile Mngxitama, Eusebius McKaiser and Pik Botha. The main focus of the show was the legacy of Nelson Mandela.

In 2016, Mazibuko criticised the almost total dominance of white males within the DA's 'brains trust'. Despite being at odds with her party, she has also remained an ardent critic of the ANC, however.

As of July 2021, she is Executive Director of Apolitical Academy.

Other sources
 Owning the Future: Mazibuko and the Changing Face of the DA (2013), by Donwald Pressly, Kwela Books, Cape Town, .

References

Offices held 

Living people
Democratic Alliance (South Africa) politicians
1980 births
Members of the National Assembly of South Africa
Harvard Kennedy School alumni
Harvard Institute of Politics
Women members of the National Assembly of South Africa
University of KwaZulu-Natal alumni
University of Cape Town alumni
Harvard University alumni
Swazi emigrants to South Africa